The Woodbourne Forest and Wildlife Preserve is a protected area managed by The Nature Conservancy covering  in northeastern Pennsylvania.  The preserve contains old fields, meadows, creeks, bogs, and forests that are home to a wide variety of animals.  These include over 180 species of birds such as pileated woodpeckers, great horned owls, and winter wrens.  The preserve's wetlands harbor frogs, snakes, and nine species of salamander, including the spring salamander, northern two-lined salamander, and four-toed salamander.  The preserve's forests, part of the  Allegheny Highlands forests ecoregion, contain  of old growth northern hardwood forest that includes eastern hemlock, sweet birch, sugar maple, northern red oak, white ash, and American beech.  Visitor activities include hiking, snowshoeing, cross-country skiing, birdwatching, and photography.

This Preserve is just south of Montrose, Pennsylvania.

References

Nature reserves in Pennsylvania
Old-growth forests
Protected areas of Susquehanna County, Pennsylvania